The following Union Army units and commanders fought in the Battle of New Market in the American Civil War. The Confederate order of battle is shown separately. Order of battle compiled from the army organization during the battle and the reports.

Abbreviations used

Military rank
 MG = Major General
 BG = Brigadier General
 Col = Colonel
 Ltc = Lieutenant Colonel
 Maj = Major
 Cpt = Captain
 Lt = Lieutenant

Other
 w = wounded
 mw = mortally wounded
 k = killed
 c = captured

Department of West Virginia
MG Franz Sigel

Notes

References
 Whitehorne, Joseph W. A, The Battle of New Market
 U.S. War Department, The War of the Rebellion: a Compilation of the Official Records of the Union and Confederate Armies, U.S. Government Printing Office, 1880–1901.

Union order of battle
American Civil War orders of battle